Anne Rollo (born Anne Margaret Jones) is an Australian professional golfer who played on the Ladies European Tour (LET).

Career overview
Rollo was born in Sydney, New South Wales, Australia. She played college golf for San Jose State University 1986–1987, culminating in her team, the Spartans, winning the NCAA Division I Women's Golf Championships in 1987 and Rollo tied for first for individual honours, coming runner-up in a playoff and gaining All-American team selection.

Rollo joined the LET in 1987. In her first full year on tour, 1988, she finished 15th on the Order of Merit. In 1990, she won the TEC Players Championship and finished 17th on the Order of Merit.

In 2014, Rollo along with her fellow NCAA winning team members, was inducted into the San Jose State University Sports Hall of Fame.

Professional wins (1)

Ladies European Tour wins (1)

References

External links
ALPG OOM 1990-1991
ALPG OOM 1991-1992
2009-10 San Jose State University Women’s Golf Roster

Australian female golfers
San Jose State Spartans women's golfers
Ladies European Tour golfers
ALPG Tour golfers
Australian expatriate sportspeople in the United States
Golfers from Sydney
1965 births
Living people